Roosevelt Park may refer to:

United States 

 Roosevelt Park, Michigan, a city
 Roosevelt Park (Albuquerque, New Mexico), a park in Albuquerque, New Mexico
 Roosevelt Park (Edison), a park in Edison, New Jersey
 Roosevelt Park (Malden), a park in Malden, Massachusetts
 Roosevelt Park (Minot), a park in Minot, North Dakota
 Roosevelt Park (senior housing), first senior housing project in the United States, built in 1936
 Franklin Delano Roosevelt Park, a park in South Philadelphia
 Sara Delano Roosevelt Park, a park in New York, New York
 Roosevelt Park Zoo, a zoo in Minot, North Dakota
 Theodore Roosevelt National Park, a U.S. national park near Dickinson, North Dakota
 Roosevelt State Park, a U.S. state park near Morton, Mississippi

Canada 
 Roosevelt Park Elementary School, a school in Prince Rupert, British Columbia

Philippines 
 Roosevelt Protected Landscape, also known as Roosevelt Park, in Bataan

South Africa 

 Roosevelt Park, a suburb of Johannesburg

See also
 Theodore Roosevelt Park (disambiguation)